SDSS J1106+1939 (SDSS J110644.95+193930.6) is a quasar, notable for its energetic matter outflow. It is the record holder for the most powerful matter outflow by a quasar. The engine is a supermassive black hole, pulling in matter at the rate of 400 solar masses per year and ejecting it at the speed of 8000 km/s. The outflow produces a luminosity of 1046  ergs. This makes the quasar more than two trillion times brighter than the Sun, one of the most luminous quasars on record. The quasar has the visual magnitude of about ~19, despite its extreme distance of 11 billion light years. The outflow of matter from the quasar produces about 1/20 of its luminosity.

References

Quasars
Supermassive black holes
SDSS objects
Leo (constellation)